AH45 is a route of the National Highway Network of India, running  from in Kolkata to Krishnagiri. This route is composed of NH 16 and part of NH 48 from Chennai to Krishnagiri.

Route 
The route shares a large portion of various Indian National Highways; namely NH 16 and NH 48.
It passes through Berhampur, Bhubaneswar, Cuttack, Jajpur, Bhadrak, Balasore, Baripada and ends at Jharpokharia, where it meets NH 16 in Odisha. In Andhra Pradesh, it passes through most of the coastal towns in ten coastal districts and covers the cities of Vizianagaram, Srikakulam, Visakhapatnam, Tuni, Rajahmundry, Eluru, Vijayawada, Mangalagiri, Guntur, Chilakaluripet, Ongole and Nellore. In Tamil Nadu, it passes through Gummidipundi in Tiruvallur district and enters Chennai.

Route length in states:
 West Bengal: 
 Odisha: 
 Andhra Pradesh: 
 Tamil Nadu: 

References 

Asian Highway Network
Roads in India